Serhiy Karpenko (born 19 May 1981, Boryspil, Kyiv Oblast, Ukrainian SSR) is a former Ukrainian football defender and Ukrainian coach.

References

External links
 Official FFU Website Profile (Ukr)
 

1981 births
Living people
People from Boryspil
Ukrainian footballers
FC Arsenal Kharkiv players
FC Helios Kharkiv players
FC Nyva Vinnytsia players
FC Kryvbas Kryvyi Rih players
FC Borysfen Boryspil players
FC Naftovyk-Ukrnafta Okhtyrka players
FC Lviv players
FC Tytan Armyansk players
SC Chaika Petropavlivska Borshchahivka players
FC Arsenal Kyiv players
Ukrainian Premier League players
Association football defenders
Ukrainian football managers
FC Avanhard Bziv
FC Nyva Buzova